Sardar Sir Jogendra Singh KCSI (25 May 1877 – 3 December 1946) was a member of the Viceroy's Executive Council in India. He served as Chairman of the Department of Health, Education and Lands. He was a figure in the Sikh community and one of several delegates chosen to represent the Sikh community before the Cripps' mission of 1942. He is also considered responsible for setting up a committee in 1946 that led to the formation of Indian Institutes of Technology.

He was knighted a second time with the KCSI in the 1946 Birthday Honours List.

Sir Jogendra Singh died of a paralytic stroke at Iqbal Nagar, district Montgomery, now in Pakistan, on 3 December 1946. He was succeeded by his second wife Winifred May Singh (née O'Donoghue) and his six children and twenty grandchildren some of whom still reside at the Aira Holme Estate, Shimla.

References

1877 births
1946 deaths
Knights Commander of the Order of the Star of India
Indian Knights Bachelor
Indian knights
Indian Sikhs
20th-century Indian politicians
Members of the Council of the Governor General of India